Events from the year 1318 in the Kingdom of Scotland.

Incumbents
Monarch – Robert I

Events
 April – Sir James Douglas, Lord of Douglas takes the town and castle of Berwick-upon-Tweed from the English, who had controlled the town since 1296.
 14 October – Battle of Faughart results in defeat and death of Edward Bruce, brother of Robert the Bruce

See also

 Timeline of Scottish history

References

 
Years of the 14th century in Scotland
Wars of Scottish Independence